Paul Zollinger (born 10 March 1944) is a Swiss former racing cyclist. He was the Swiss National Road Race champion in 1966. His twin brother Rudi was also a professional cyclist.

Major results
1966
 1st  Road race, National Road Championships
 7th Overall Tour de Suisse
 8th GP du canton d'Argovie
1967
 2nd Züri-Metzgete

References

External links
 

1944 births
Living people
Swiss male cyclists
People from Schlieren, Switzerland
Sportspeople from the canton of Zürich